Villages located in Degana Tehsil, district nagour Rajasthan State, India.

Aakeli -B
Achhojai
Achla Ka Khet
Alniyawas
Alwas
Antroli Kallan
Antroli Khurd
Bachhwari
Bachhwas
Bamna Kalan
Bamna Khurd
Banwara
Banwarla
Bari Ghati
Barna
Basni Jaga
Bedas Kalan
Bhadwasi
Bharli
Bhawal Charna
Bhawariya
Bherunda
Bichpuri
Bikharniya Kalan
Bikharniya Khurd
Bofli
Butati
Chak Chiknas
Chak Dhani
Chanda Roon
Chandni
Charanwas
Chardas
Chiknas
Chochiyas
Choliyas
Chosali
Chua
Chui
Churiyas
Daboli Khari
Daboli Mithi
Dagra
Dagari
Degana
Deogarh
Deola Kalan
Deola Mada
Dhadhariya Kalan
Dhanipura
Dodiyana
Doodhras
Dookiyasar
Doongras
Dugor Achla
Dugorchiknas
Dugor dasa ( Rathore Nagri )
Gaimaliyawas
Ghana
Gol
Gonarda
Gonardi
Goredi Chancha (CT)
Goredi Karna
Gothra
Gulabpura
Gundisar
Gunsali
Gurha Jagmalota
Gurha Jodha
Habchar
Harsor
Himmat Nagar
Idwa
Igyasani
Itawara Bhoja
Itawara Ladkhani
Jakhera
Jalsoo Kalan
Jalsoo Khurd
Jalsoo Nanak
Jaswantpura
Jawa Sisodiya
Jetpura Kalan
Jetpura Khurd
Jhagarwas
Jodhras
Kalan Ka Was
Kalni Kumaran
Kalyanpura
Kanwal
Karasora
Kartasar
Keriya Rawan
Khanpura
Khariya Kalan
Khariya Khurd
Kharolwas
Khatolai
Kheri Champa
Kherwa
Khindas
Khivtana
Khiyas
Khuri Kalan
Khuri Khurd
Killa
Kirad
Kitalsar
Kod
Kodiya
Kutiyasani Kalan
Kutiyasani Khurd
Ladpura
Lakheena
Langod
Lawadar
Luniyas
Maharana
Mandal Deva
Mandal Jodha
Mandelpura
Manjhee
Mathaniya
Meora
Mithriya
Miyasar
Modriya
Mogas
Mori Kalan
Moriyana
Narsingh Basni
Nathawara
Nathawari
Nenas bidsya ki dhani
Nimbari Chandawatan
Nimbari Kalan
Nimbari Kothariyan
Nimbola Biswa
Nimbola Kalan
Nimbola Khurd
Nimbola Purohitan
Noond
karwa ki dhani
Oriyana
Pachranda Khurd
Paliyas
Palri Kalan
Pandwala
Patniya
Peepliya
Polas Vishnoiyan
Poonas
Pundlota
Puniyas
Rajapura
Rajlota
Rajod
Rakiyasani
Raliyawata
Ramgarh
Ramsari
Ranas
Rata Dhoondha
Rawaliyawas
Rawatkhera
Rewat
Rohisara
Sandas
Saneriya
Sanjoo
Sanwaliyawas
Sarsanda
Sathana Kalan
Sathana Khurd
Sathani
Shahpura
Shekhpura
Sindhlas
Sirasana
Soodwar
Sukhwasni
Sundari
Suraj Garh
Suriyas
Surpura
Tamroli
Tehla
Thanwala
Thata
Tilanesh
Udiyas

References

Rajasthan-related lists

Degana